Vassos Shiarly (born 1948) is a British Cypriot banker and politician. He studied at the London School of Economics and Wayne State University. From 23 March 2012 until 28 February 2013, Shiarly served as the Finance Minister of Cyprus. He was responsible for implementing a second round of austerity measures.

Career 

Shiarly worked for 19 years in various accounting firms in London. His last employment before repatriating to Cyprus in 1985 was with then Coopers & Lybrand (now PricewaterhouseCoopers), where he held the position of Senior Manager. In Cyprus, Shiarly became actively involved in the banking sector joining the Bank of Cyprus initially at the Bank's Investments arm and later to the position of Senior Manager of Customer Management Services. From 1998 to 2009 he served as a Senior Group general manager of banking Operations and Development. From 2009 to May 2010 he was the Senior general manager of the Bank. He was called to serve as Minister of Finance in 2012 after Kikis Kazamias resignation for medical reasons. Shiarly also serves as Governor of the European Bank for Reconstruction and Development.

Recognition 

 He was elected chairman of the board of directors of the Association of Cyprus Banks for the period 2009–2010.
 In December 2010 he was elected chairman of the board of directors of the Cyprus anti-Cancer Society.
 In November 2011 he was appointed by the Council of Ministers of the Republic of Cyprus as Chairman of the Cyprus Health Insurance Organization.
 Shiarly also served as a member of the board of directors of the Junior School in Nicosia for six years.

References 

1948 births
Living people
Cyprus Ministers of Finance